The 2009–10 Marshall Thundering Herd men's basketball team represented Marshall University in the 2009–10 college basketball season as a member of Conference USA (C-USA). They played their home games at the Cam Henderson Center and were led by fourth year head coach Donnie Jones.

Roster

Schedule 

|-
!colspan=9| Exhibition

|-
!colspan=9| Regular season

|-

|-

|-

|-
!colspan=9| 2010 C-USA Basketball tournament

|-
!colspan=9| 2010 CollegeInsider.com Postseason Tournament

References

Marshall Thundering Herd men's basketball seasons
Marshall
Marshall
Marsh
Marsh